Novo Selo Žumberačko is a settlement (naselje) in the Samobor administrative territory of Zagreb County, Croatia. As of 2011 it had a population of 24 people.

References

Populated places in Zagreb County